María de los Ángeles Caso Machicado (born 16 July 1959 in Gijón) is a Spanish journalist, translator and writer. She is a recipient of the Premio Planeta de Novela.

Her father, José Miguel Caso González, was a professor and vice-chancellor at the Faculty of Philology of the University of Oviedo. She studied History and Geography, but she worked later as a journalist in Panorama regional. She also worked for the Prince of Asturias Foundation or the Institute Feijoo of 18th century studies at the University of Oviedo and in different media like Televisión Española, Cadena SER and Radio Nacional de España.

Prizes
Finalist Premio Planeta, El peso de las sombras, 1994
Premio Fernando Lara, Un largo silencio, 2000
Premio Planeta, Contra el viento, 2009

Filmography
 Telediario, TVE (1985–1986)
 La Tarde, TVE (1985–1986)
Deseo (by Gerardo Vera, script) (2002)

Works 
Asturias desde la noche. 1988. Guía.
Elisabeth, emperatriz de Austria-Hungría o el hada. 1993.
El peso de las sombras. 1994. Finalista XLIII Premio Planeta 1994.
El inmortal. 1996, compilation: Érase una vez la paz.
El mundo visto desde el cielo. 1997.
El resto de la vida. 1998.
El verano de Lucky. 1999.
La trompa de los monos. 1999, compilation: Mujeres al alba
La alegría de vivir. 1999, compilation: Hijas y padres
Un largo silencio. 2000. V Premio Fernando Lara de novela.
Giuseppe Verdi, la intensa vida de un genio. 2001. Biography of Giuseppe Verdi.
Las olvidadas, una historia de mujeres creadoras. 2005.
Contra el viento.2009. LVIII Premio Planeta 2009.
 Donde se alzan los tronos. 2012
 Rahima Begum. 2013
 Todo ese fuego. 2016. Novel based on the Bronte Sisters

References

External links
  Blog de Ángeles Caso en el diario Público

1959 births
Living people
20th-century Spanish novelists
21st-century Spanish novelists
People from Gijón